Konrad Grallert von Cebrów (27 March 1865 – 1942) was a divisional commander in the Austro-Hungarian Army.

Life 
Feldmarschall-Leutnant Konrad Grallert von Cebrów was born as Konrad Karl August Grallert in Gumbinnen (East Prussia) to Joachim Grallert (a prominent watchmaker and jeweller) and Berthe Hoefler.

His family moved to Arad in the Transylvanian region of Hungary (now part of Romania) in 1867. He was a qualified general staff officer and certainly by his appointment at the cadet school at Kraków in 1901 was already a member of the general staff.

He was involved with the German attacks that were repulsed by the Russians on the Dvina and at Cebrow in Galicia on 9 March 1916. He was raised to nobility by Charles IV and received the right to use the name "of Cebrow” in 1917 or 1918.

Konrad's older brother inherited the family business and after the war Konrad moved to Papa, which is in Western Hungary today. He was the head teacher of a secondary school. He died in Budapest, 1942.

Promotions 
 Hauptmann 1. Classe:	1 May 1896
 Major:			01 Nov 1903
 Oberstleutnant:	01 Nov 1907
 Oberst: 		04 Jan 1911
 Generalmajor:		05 Dec 1914
 Feldmarschall-Leutnant:	08 Dec 1917

Appointments 
 Senior Instructor Infantry Cadet School Lobzów near Craców:	1901
 Chief of Staff II Hungarian Landwehr District:			1903
 Chief of Staff 15th Infantry Division:				1909
 Commanding officer Infantry Regiment Number 101:		Oct 1910 - Sep 1914
 Commander 64th Infantry Brigade:				Sep 1914 - July 1916
 Commander 61st Infantry Division:				July - Dec 1916
 Commander 74th Honvéd Infantry Division:			Apr 1917 - Oct 1917
 Inspector of Replacements Craców				1918 - war's end

Decorations 
 Military Merit Cross 2nd Class with War Decoration
 Order of the Iron Crown 2nd Class with War Decoration and Swords
 Knight's Cross of the Order of Leopold with War Decoration and Swords
 Order of the Iron Crown 3rd Class with War Decoration and Swords
 Bronze Military Merit Medal (Signum Laudis) with Swords
 Military Jubilee Medal 1898
 Military Jubilee Cross 1908
 Mobilization Cross 1912-13

19th-century Austrian people
19th-century Hungarian people
20th-century Hungarian people
Austro-Hungarian people
Austro-Hungarian military personnel of World War I
Hungarian people of German descent
Austrian people of Prussian descent
Austrian people of German descent
Austrian people of Hungarian descent
Hungarian nobility
People from Gusev
People from the Province of Prussia
People from Arad, Romania
1865 births
1942 deaths